The 1968 Drexel Dragons football team represented the Drexel Institute of Technology (renamed Drexel University in 1970) as a member of the Middle Atlantic Conference during the 1968 NCAA College Division football season.  Tom Grebis was the team's head coach.

Schedule

References

Drexel
Drexel Dragons football seasons
Drexel Dragons football